Gmina Legnickie Pole (German:Wahlstatt Gemeinde) is a rural gmina (administrative district) in Legnica County, Lower Silesian Voivodeship, in south-western Poland.

Neighbouring gminas
Gmina Legnickie Pole is bordered by the town of Legnica and the gminas of Krotoszyce, Kunice, Męcinka, Mściwojów, Ruja and Wądroże Wielkie.

Villages
The gmina contains the villages of Bartoszów, Biskupice, Czarnków, Gniewomierz, Kłębanowice, Koiszków, Koskowice, Księginice, Legnickie Pole, Lubień, Mąkolice, Mikołajowice, Nowa Wieś Legnicka, Ogonowice, Psary, Raczkowa, Strachowice and Taczalin.

References

Legnickie Pole
Legnica County